KonaKart is a Java eCommerce system aimed at medium to large online retailers. The KonaKart product is owned by DS Data Systems UK Ltd with staff in Italy and the UK.  DS Data Systems UK Ltd is part of the Zucchetti Group.

KonaKart provides an extensive set of features to enable retailers to successfully sell their products over the internet.  It is a Java / JSP / Javascript / XML based solution with easy to use java APIs (POJO, SOAP, JAXWS, JSON and RMI) that allow retailers to quickly integrate eCommerce functionality into existing systems. The customizable parts of KonaKart are Open Source and available under the GNU LGPL.

KonaKart includes both a Storefront application (with a Responsive Design) and an AJAX-enabled Administration Application.  The Administration Application includes role-based security which allows companies to define the administrative functions that should be allowed for different user groups.

Key Features of KonaKart include:
 Comprehensive eCommerce / shopping cart functionality
 Ease of integration through its complete set of Java, SOAP, JAXWS, JSON and RMI APIs
 Ease of creation of unique storefronts by using the jQuery / Javascript libraries
 Ease of customization - with examples, tutorials and source code available
 High performance, scalability and reliability
 Ability to run as a portlet - e.g. in Liferay
 Easy to integrate with any CMS or ERP system
 Wide choice of supported databases (MySQL, Oracle, PostgreSQL, DB2, MS SQL Server)

There are two versions of KonaKart:

The Community Edition of is free and can be downloaded from the KonaKart website.
The Enterprise Extensions Edition is chargeable and has more features that tend to appeal to larger Enterprises.

Clients 
KonaKart has a number of notable clients worldwide including Sony, Treasury Wine Estates, Audi, Tesco, Coop, O2, Leroy Merlin, MasterCard, RAND Corporation, The Vatican, Si.mobil, Selgros, Tallink, Weleda, dm-drogerie markt, Verizon Communications Inc. and Edeka.

References

External links 
 KonaKart Official Website

Providers of services to on-line companies
Java (programming language)